Pernikahan Dini (English translation: Dini's Wedding, or Early-age Marriage) is a soap opera that aired on RCTI in 2001. The soap opera starring An Ensemble Cast such as Agnes Monica, Sahrul Gunawan, Alatarik Syah, Lydia Kandou, and Meriam Bellina. The series won two times at the Panasonic Awards for "Favorite Drama Series Program" in 2001 and 2002.

Synopsis
In this Agnes Monica soap opera, she plays Dini, a smart high school girl. Dini has loads of friends. For a vacation, they go to Bandung, where she meets a guy and falls in love with him. At her birthday party, she is unable to control herself and gets intimate with the guy. A few weeks later, she realizes that she is pregnant, so her family forced the man to marry her. From here, the domestic conflicts began.

This soap opera aired on RCTI and produced by Prima Entertainment.

Cast
 Agnes Monica as Dini, the lead role, the daughter of Duta and Shinta, the sister of Doddy
 Sahrul Gunawan as Gunawan, a village boy who caught his attention and the husband of Dini
 Alatarik Syah as Doddy, the brother of Dini, who raped Asniar's daughter
 Elma Theana as Vina
 Lydia Kandou as Mrs. Shinta, the wife of Duta and mother of Doddy and Dini
 Rudy Salam as Mr. Duta, the husband of Shinta and father of Doddy and Dini
 Meriam Bellina as Mrs. Sudrajat, the wife of Mr. Sudrajat
 Della Puspita as Ratna
 Sigit Hardadi as Mr. Sudrajat, the husband of Mrs. Sudrajat
 Yati Surachman as Asniar, the mother of Dyah, who ever did accused embarrassing
 Enno Lerian as Delia
 Errina GD as Pipit
 Fera Rachmi as Dyah, the daughter of Asniar, who raped by Doddy
 Jennifer Arnelita as Fanny
 Risma Nilawati as Sisiel
 Diva Nadia as Becky
 Eza Yayang as Jordy

Controversy
The two actress also played in this soap opera, Enno Lerian and Errina, made to suffer because Agnes Monica's act. Suddenly, Pipit and Delia's character, who played by both of actress, was removed. The scriptwriter, Eric and Nuke, said "The request was submitted directly by the producer for no apparent reason."

According to Erina, who role as Pipit, cause she was kicked out of the soap opera because often clashed with the schedule of the main character. It is also often trigger an argument. She resigned that "If it's a fight for sure the parents come forward. Better to give in, rather than my relationship with Agnes worse."

Other with Enno, she admitted shocked with this decision. Because, according to information obtained from the screenwriter. Delia's character portrayed by her to until 20 episodes. She quietly said "While me have completed eight episodes."

Theme Song
The single "Pernikahan Dini" and "Seputih Hati", sung by Agnes Monica, also became the opening theme and ending theme in the soap opera. The two singles was created by the top musician, Melly Goeslaw, and included to be compilation album was labeled by Aquarius Musikindo, Love Theme.

Rating
This is rating of Pernikahan Dini:

Awards and nominations

References

Indonesian drama television series
2001 Indonesian television series debuts
2002 Indonesian television series endings
Indonesian television soap operas
2000s Indonesian television series